This is a list of airlines currently operating in Brunei.

Scheduled airlines

Government airlines

See also
 List of airlines
 List of defunct airlines of Asia
 List of defunct airlines of State of Brunei

Airlines
Airlines
Brunei
Brunei